The Europe Zone was one of the two regional zones of the 1947 Davis Cup.

20 teams entered the Europe Zone, with the winner going on to compete in the Inter-Zonal Final against the winner of the America Zone. Czechoslovakia defeated Yugoslavia in the final, and went on to face Australia in the Inter-Zonal Final.

Draw

First round

Belgium vs. Luxembourg

Spain vs. Egypt

Greece vs. Switzerland

Sweden vs. Czechoslovakia

Second round

Poland vs. Great Britain

Netherlands vs. South Africa

Ireland vs. Yugoslavia

Belgium vs. Egypt

Czechoslovakia vs. Switzerland

Norway vs. New Zealand

France vs. India

Quarterfinals

Great Britain vs. South Africa

Belgium vs. Yugoslavia

Czechoslovakia vs. New Zealand

France vs. Monaco

Semifinals

Yugoslavia vs. South Africa

Czechoslovakia vs. France

Final

Yugoslavia vs. Czechoslovakia

References

External links
Davis Cup official website

Davis Cup Europe/Africa Zone
Europe Zone
Davis Cup